Jack Wells Davis (September 11, 1930 – July 20, 2012) was an American track and field hurdler, silver medalist in the 1952 and 1956 Olympics over 110-meter hurdles. Davis lost to Harrison Dillard in 1952 with the same time as the winner, and lost to Lee Calhoun in 1956, again with the same time as the winner.  He set a new world record 13.4 in a heat at the AAU in 1956.

Davis attended Herbert Hoover High School in Glendale, California, where he won both hurdle races at the 1949 CIF California State Meet, along with a third in the long jump.  After that performance, he was named "Athlete of the Meet."  He then went to the University of Southern California. At USC he was a three-time NCAA 120y hurdle champion and the 1953 NCAA 220y hurdle champion.  He was a three-time U.S. Outdoor 220y hurdles champion, and ranked #1 on three occasions.  In 2004, he was inducted into the USA Track & Field Hall of Fame, and the USC Hall of Fame.

Davis served in the U.S. Navy in 1954–57, and then became a real estate developer. He helped found the United States Olympic Training Center in Chula Vista, California.

References

External links 
 

1930 births
2012 deaths
American male hurdlers
Athletes (track and field) at the 1952 Summer Olympics
Athletes (track and field) at the 1955 Pan American Games
Athletes (track and field) at the 1956 Summer Olympics
Olympic silver medalists for the United States in track and field
University of Southern California alumni
Sportspeople from Glendale, California
Track and field athletes from California
Medalists at the 1956 Summer Olympics
Medalists at the 1952 Summer Olympics
Pan American Games gold medalists for the United States
Pan American Games medalists in athletics (track and field)
Medalists at the 1955 Pan American Games